Sokil is the name of several rural settlements in Ukraine:
Sokil, Vinnytsia Oblast, a village in Vinnytsia Oblast 
Sokil, Volyn Oblast, Lyubomlsk District, a village in Lyubomlsk District,  Volyn Oblast  
Sokil, Volyn Oblast, Rozhyschensk District, a village in Volyn Oblast
Sokil, Donetsk Oblast, a village in Donetsk Oblast  
Sokil, Ivano-Frankivsk Oblast, a village in Halych District, Ivano-Frankivsk Oblast 
Sokil, Lviv Oblast, a village in Lviv Oblast  
Sokil, Khmelnytsky Oblast, a village in Kamyanets-Podilsky District, Khmelnytsky Oblast

See also 
 Sokil (disambiguation)
 Sokal (disambiguation)
 Sokol (disambiguation)